Ostroznica may refer to:
Ostrožnica, a village in Bosnia and Herzegovina
Ostrożnica, a village in Poland
Ostrožnica, Snina District, a village in Slovakia